P. P. Chaudhary (born 12 July 1953) is a Senior Advocate and an Indian politician. He is a member of the Bharatiya Janata Party (BJP) and represents Pali Lok Sabha constituency (Rajasthan) in the 17th Lok Sabha. Currently Chaudhary is  Chairperson of the Parliamentary Standing  Committee on External Affairs and Joint Committee on Jan Vishwas (Amendment of Provisions) Bill 2022. He is also a member of the Estimates Committee, Business Advisory Committee, General Purposes Committee of Lok Sabha and Consultative Committee of Ministry of Home Affairs, Govt. of India.

Early life and education
Chaudhary was born in Bhavi village of Jodhpur, Rajasthan on 12 July, 1953 to a farming family. He joined Rashtriya Swayamsevak Sangh Shakha at the age of eight & his early education was sponsored by RSS. He obtained two Bachelor degrees, B.Sc. and L.L.B. from Jai Narain Vyas University, Jodhpur. He started practicing law from 1978 in the Jodhpur High Court. He is married to Veena Pani Chaudhary & has two children.

Political journey
He won his first Indian general elections in 2014 from Pali Lok Sabha constituency with a victory margin of over 4 lakh votes and again won in 2019 with a margin of 5 lakh votes. He was felicitated with the 'Sansad Ratna Award' for two consecutive years in 2015 & 2016 for outstanding performance in Lok Sabha.

Ministerial roles
  

Chaudhary was sworn in as Minister of state in the Union Council of Ministers on 5 July, 2016 and assumed charge at the Ministry of Electronics and Information Technology. As part of his charge, he has worked on bridging the digital divide between urban and rural areas, promoting connection of as many as 1 lakh gram panchayats by the optical fibre network and bringing Wi-fi hotspots to all villages. 

Chaudhary also held the post of Minister of State for Ministry of Law and Justice from 5 July, 2016 to 30 May 2019, working with Union Law Minister Ravi Shankar Prasad. As Minister of State, Chaudhary represented the Government of India at the Marrakech Law Ministers International Conference on Justice in Marrakech, Morocco, under the theme “the independence of the judiciary” from 01 - 5 April 2018. He also led a delegation to the SCO Justice Ministers’ Meeting in Tashkent in October 2017 as MoS. 

Chaudhary was designated the post of Minister of State for Ministry of Corporate Affairs on 3 September 2017. As minister of state he undertook a massive drive to strike off names of 2.5 lakh non-compliant shell companies.

Positions  

Chaudhary assumed the post of Chairperson of Parliamentary Standing Committee on External Affairs on 13 September 2019. As part of his ongoing tenure, the committee has submitted more than 15 reports to the parliament. Chaudhary was appointed as the Chairperson of the Joint Parliamentary Committee on Personal Data Protection Bill 2019. The 30-member committee headed by Chaudhary tabled its report, making close to 100 recommendations, in December 2021, after almost two years of deliberation. 

2019 onwards, Chaudhary holds the following additional posts as a member of various committees – 
	Member, Business Advisory Committee, Lok Sabha
	Member, All India Institute of Medical Sciences (AIIMS), Jodhpur
	Member, Committee on Estimates, Lok Sabha
	Member, Consultative Committee, Ministry of Home Affairs, Govt. of India
	Member, General Purposes Committee, Lok Sabha

Chaudhary has previously also held the following designations – 
	Member, Standing Committee on Personnel, Public Grievances, Law and Justice. Member, Committee on Subordinate Legislation, Lok Sabha (1 Sep. 2014 - 5 July 2016)
	Chairperson, Joint Parliamentary Committee on Offices of Profit, Lok Sabha. Member, Consultative Committee, Ministry of Finance & Corporate Affairs, Govt. of India (11 Dec. 2014 - 5 July 2016)
	Member, General Purposes Committee - Lok Sabha. Member, Central Direct Taxes Advisory Committee, Ministry of Finance, Govt. of India (29 Jan. 2015 - 5 July 2016)
	Member, Joint Committee on the Right to Fair Compensation and Transparency in Land Acquisition, Rehabilitation and Resettlement (Second Amendment) Bill, 2015 (13 May 2015 - 5 July 2016)
	Member, International Executive Committee, Commonwealth Parliamentary Association, London, UK (Union Branch - Parliament of India) (11 Sept. 2015 - 5 July 2016)
	Member, Joint Committee on the Insolvency and bankruptcy Code (23 Dec. 2015 - 5 July 2016)
	Chairperson, Fellowship Committee, Lok Sabha (25 April 2016 - 5 July 2016)
	Member, Joint Committee on the Enforcement of Security Interest and Recovery of Debts Laws and Miscellaneous Provision (Amendment) Bill, 2016 (11 May 2016 - 5 July 2016)

Additional information
  

Chaudhary represented India at the International parliamentary Conference on Human Rights in the Houses of London, U.K. He also attended International Executive Committee and General Assembly Meetings, Commonwealth Parliamentary Association, London, U.K. in 2015 and 2016; putting forward India’s viewpoint on the issue of Jammu & Kashmir. He was elected as Member of International Executive Committee, Common Wealth Parliamentary Association London, U.K. (Union Branch - Parliament of India) for three years. 

In October, 2016 he chaired the meeting with US & Dutch lawyers in Hague (Holland), working to finalize an appeal to be filed in the Hague Court of Justice with respect to the huge award rendered against the Government of India in Devas-Antrix Case. Chaudhary visited St. Vincent and the Grenadines in 2018 and met Prime Minister of St. Vincent and the Grenadines, Dr. Ralph Everard Gonsalves, under the “Brihad Sampark Yojana”, an outreach initiative by the Ministry of External Affairs to expand the bilateral relations of India with countries across the world.  He also visited Barbados in April 2018 and met Prime Minister of Barbados, H.E Freundel Stuart, as a part of the initiative.

Social works 

Chaudhary has been working for the upliftment of the poor farmers and marginalized sections of the society in Rajasthan and has pursued many cases of farmers related to irrigation projects. He has worked along with his wife to improve & uplift the educational status of children, especially girls in the areas and around his parliamentary constituency, Pali. He has provided insurance cover for 2,00,000 (two lakh) women of Pali Parliamentary Constituency from his own Parliamentary Salary.

He has installed more than 50,000 solar street lights in every village of his parliamentary constituency under CSR initiatives. As part of his initiative “Sansad Aapke Dwar” he has travelled to all 500 Gram Panchayats of Pali Lok Sabha. He has provided hostel facilities in urban areas for students of rural areas to facilitate higher education, especially for girls, and has actively been associated with eye camps, rural development programs and sports competitions in his constituency.

Legal profession

Chaudhary has been practicing law since 1978 in High Courts and the Supreme Court of India. He has been designated as senior advocate at the Jodhpur HC and at the Supreme Court of India. He has a profile of around 11000 (Eleven Thousand) cases, mostly Constitutional Litigation including matters relating to - Constitutional Law, Land Acquisition, Farmers Grievances, Labour & Service, Central Excise & Customs, PIL - related to restoration of natural water bodies & dams, Mines and Minerals, Covenants, Arbitrations, Indian Bankruptcy code and Companies Law.

References

External links

Official Video Channel on Veblr.com
Loksabha Members Bioprofile
PP Chaudhary speech by in order to increase air travel in western Rajasthan at Parliament

1953 births
Bharatiya Janata Party politicians from Rajasthan
Indian Hindus
20th-century Indian lawyers
Indian solicitors
Living people
Rajasthani people
Senior Advocates in India
Narendra Modi ministry
India MPs 2014–2019
India MPs 2019–present
Lok Sabha members from Rajasthan
People from Jodhpur
People from Pali district